Nicholas Otaru (born 15 July 1986, Turku, Finland) is a Finnish retired professional football player. Otaru was born to a Nigerian father and a Finnish mother.

References

External links
Profile at Guardian Football
 Profile at RoPS 
 
 

1986 births
Living people
Association football midfielders
FC Honka players
Rovaniemen Palloseura players
Finnish footballers
Finland under-21 international footballers
Finnish people of Nigerian descent
FC Espoo players
Footballers from Turku